Houston is an unincorporated community in Salt Creek Township, Jackson County, Indiana.

History
A post office was established at Houston in 1850, and remained in operation until it was discontinued in 1911. Houston was laid out in 1853, and named for Leonard Houston, a pioneer settler.

Geography

References

Unincorporated communities in Jackson County, Indiana
Unincorporated communities in Indiana